Oblivion 2: Backlash (also released as Backlash: Oblivion 2) is a 1996 American direct-to-video space western film directed by Sam Irvin, written by Peter David, from a story by Charles Band, Mark Goldstein, John Rheaume and Greg Suddeth. Produced by Full Moon Entertainment and was shot in Romania, it is a sequel to the 1994 film Oblivion.

The first film's cast (Richard Joseph Paul, Andrew Divoff, George Takei, Julie Newmar, Isaac Hayes, Musetta Vander and Meg Foster) reprise their roles, with Maxwell Caulfield as a new antagonist.

Synopsis
The film begins shortly after the events of the first film. The setting is the alien-western world of Oblivion.

A suave, yet lethal bounty hunter named Sweeney arrives to arrest the seductive outlaw Lash on multiple charges, including murder. Sweeney is the deadliest bounty hunter in the universe, and despite appearing as an English dandy, is something far more sinister.

Lash, who just "inherited" a mine of Derconium (the most valuable mineral in the universe) from Crowley in a game of cards, meets up with Redeye's brother, Jaggar.

Sherriff Zack had killed Redeye in a duel in the previous film. Jaggar wants the mine for himself and use its ore to rule the galaxy.

Miss Kitty, owner of the local bar/cathouse reveals to Zack that she is a wanted woman.

A fight develops over Lash between the sheriff of Oblivion (Zack), Jaggar and Sweeney. In the resulting battle, Miss Kitty is apparently killed. With Jaggar defeated, Sweeney departs.

Miss Kitty, alive, makes an appearance at her own funeral.

Cast

Production
Principal photography took place in Romania back-to-back with the first film.

Newmar stated in Starlog that she liked the story and the character, and drew on her experience of running a real estate agency in her portrayal of Miss Kitty.

Reception
TV Guide gave the film two out of five stars. liking the cast but finding they had little to work with. Entertainment Weekly found the film "nerd-fun", but commented that the film was padded and that the sex scene was unnecessary. Creature Feature preferred the first movie.

References

External links
 
 
 

1996 films
1990s science fiction comedy films
1996 independent films
1990s Western (genre) science fiction films
American Western (genre) science fiction films
American science fiction comedy films
American independent films
American sequel films
Films directed by Sam Irvin
Films scored by Pino Donaggio
Films set in the 31st century
Films set on fictional planets
Films shot in Romania
Space Western films
Full Moon Features films
1990s English-language films
1990s American films